Berja (Devanagari: बेरजा Berjá) is a village in Morar block of Gwalior district, in Madhya Pradesh, India. As of 2011, the village population is 1,963, in 346 households.

History 
At the beginning of the 20th century, Berja was part of Gwalior State. Located in the pargana and zila of Gird Gwalior, it had a population of 418 and an area of 5,492 bighas.

References 

Villages in Gwalior district